Craig Carlton Keith (born April 27, 1971) is a former American football tight end  who played three seasons in the National Football League (NFL) with the Pittsburgh Steelers  and Jacksonville Jaguars. He was drafted by the Pittsburgh Steelers in the seventh round of the 1993 NFL Draft. He played college football at Lenoir-Rhyne University and attended Millbrook High School in Raleigh, North Carolina.

References

External links
Just Sports Stats
Fanbase profile

Living people
1971 births
Players of American football from Raleigh, North Carolina
American football tight ends
African-American players of American football
Lenoir–Rhyne Bears football players
Millbrook High School (NC) alumni
Pittsburgh Steelers players
Jacksonville Jaguars players
Lenoir–Rhyne University alumni